is a Japanese professional baseball pitcher for the Orix Buffaloes in Japan's Nippon Professional Baseball.
Kaneda was drafted 5th in the 2012 draft and made his first team debut on opening day of the 2014 season (March 28, 2014), pitching a scoreless 7th inning against the Yomiuri Giants.

References

External links

1990 births
Living people
Baseball people from Kagoshima Prefecture
Japanese baseball players
Nippon Professional Baseball pitchers
Hanshin Tigers players
Orix Buffaloes players